Khaziyevo (Xaji) is a rural locality (a village) in Chelkakovsky Selsoviet, Burayevsky District, Bashkortostan, Russia. The population was 66 as of 2010. There is 1 street.

Geography 
Khaziyevo is located 34 km southwest of Burayevo (the district's administrative centre) by road. Tansyzarovo is the nearest rural locality.

References 

Rural localities in Burayevsky District